Hi-pass is the name of a system for the expressways in South Korea that allows motorists to make wireless toll payments, without the need to stop.

It uses DSRC (Dedicated Short-Range Communication), allowing for automatic settlement of tolls, by communication between the car terminal and the toll gate equipment.

History
2000
January 6: Korea Expressway Corporation announces plan for trial run from March 2000
June 30: Hi-pass trial run conducted at three toll gate locations, Seongnam, Cheonggye, and Pangyo; one car for each south-bound lane, total of six cars

2001
April: Suspension of leases of new terminals due to an issue of using frequencies of the Ministry of Information and Communication

2005
October 31: Introduction of additional Hi-pass toll gate locations, including Incheon, Nam-Incheon, Hanam, and Topyeong

2007
December 20: Full operation at all toll gate locations country-wide

2008
April 1: Management of Hi-pass+ card transferred from Korea Expressway Corporation to Hi-pass+ Card Co., Ltd.
September 1: Commencement of issuance of Hi-pass terminals for box trucks under 4.5 tons and trucks under 1.5 tons
October 6: Achieved a 30% average usage rate country-wide
October 16: Suspension of new leases of Hi-pass terminals, continued instead with selling terminals

2009
March 25: Introduction of post-pay Hi-pass car service / Discontinuation of pre-pay electronic card charging system

2010
July 1: Expansion of Hi-pass usage of trucks under 4.5 tons (box trucks and open freight trucks)
December 2: Achieved a 50% average usage rate country-wide

2011
November 28: Expansion of Hi-pass usage of specialized vehicles, including tow trucks

2014
September 1: Introduction of Hi-pass "Happy Terminal"

2015
October 12: Introduction of Hi-pass "Happy Terminal" for trucks prior to expanding Hi-pass usage for trucks over 4.5 tons
October 15: Expansion of usage of Hi-pass for trucks over 4.5 tons (length of less than 2.5 m, height of loaded freight less than 3.0 m)

2016
March 29: Conversion to Hi-pass exclusive usage for trucks more than 4.5 tons

2017
October: Introduction of smart tolling system at Nam-Sooncheon toll gate and Namhae Expressway Seoyeongam toll gate

References

Fare collection systems in South Korea